Coleophora vestianella is a moth of the family Coleophoridae. It is found from Europe to Asia Minor, Iran, Afghanistan, China, the Korean Peninsula and Japan.

Adults are on wing from June to August.

The larvae feed on Chenopodium (including Chenopodium album) and Atriplex species (including Atriplex patula). They feed on the generative organs of their host plant.

Synonyms
 Coleophora annulatella Nylander, 1848
 Coleophora botauripennella Toll, 1955
 Coleophora laripennella Toll, 1953
 Coleophora subtractella Caradja, 1920
 Coleophora tengstromella Doubleday, 1859
 Ecebalia vestianella (Linnaeus, 1758)
 Phalaena (Tinea) vestianella Linnaeus, 1758
 Ornix laripennella Zetterstedt, 1839

References

External links
 
 Swedish Moths
 Coleophora vestianella at ukmoths

vestianella
Moths described in 1758
Moths of Asia
Moths of Europe
Taxa named by Carl Linnaeus